Beside You: 30 Years of Hits is a 2009 greatest hits album by New Zealand singer-songwriter Dave Dobbyn. The album debuted at number 4 on the New Zealand Music Charts.

Track listing
The album covers a decade since the 1999 greatest hits Overnight Success. The second disc also includes notable album tracks from over Dobbyn's career. It features a number of re-recorded songs ("Devil You Know", "Outlook For Thursday", "Whaling", "Guilty", and "Shaky Isles"), though unlike  Overnight Success it features the original version of "Be Mine Tonight". According to Dobbyn, the new versions are on the album to reflect how the songs have changed through years of live performance.

DVD
The limited edition of the CD also included a DVD with the following chapters.
 Th' Dudes
 On The Road
 Slice Of Heaven
 Otaki
 Mad Ave.
 Te Henga
 Bic Runga
 Piano Man
 Welcome Home

References

Dave Dobbyn albums
2009 greatest hits albums